Amy M. Charity (born November 25, 1976) is an American former professional racing cyclist, who rode professionally for the  team in 2015. She raced in the 2015 UCI Road World Championships. Since retiring, Charity co-founded the SBT GRVL off-road event in Steamboat Springs, Colorado.

Major results

2013
 1st Road race, Colorado State Road Championships
 1st Tour de Park City
2014
 4th Overall Tour de Feminin-O cenu Českého Švýcarska
2015
 1st  Team time trial, National Road Championships
 10th Overall Redlands Bicycle Classic

See also
 List of 2015 UCI Women's Teams and riders

References

External links
 
 

1976 births
Living people
American female cyclists
People from Fort Collins, Colorado
21st-century American women